The 1913–14 season was the 19th season of competitive football in Belgium.

Overview
Daring Club de Bruxelles won the Division I. A test match was organised between newcomer A.A. La Gantoise and Standard Club Liégois as both teams ended the season with 13 points at the 10th place. Standard lost the match and was relegated to the Promotion. The other team to be relegated was Léopold Club de Bruxelles. After that season, football was stopped due to World War I. The competitions resumed in 1919.

National team

* Belgium score given first

Key
 H = Home match
 A = Away match
 N = On neutral ground
 F = Friendly
 o.g. = own goal

Honours

Final league tables

Division I

Promotion

External links
RSSSF archive - Final tables 1895-2002
Belgian clubs history
Belgium Soccer History